is a 2009 Japanese animated film produced by ufotable based on The Garden of Sinners novels by Kinoko Nasu. It is the seventh installment in the series, preceded by Oblivion Recording (2008) and followed by a sequel Future Gospel (2013). Chronologically, the events that occur in The Garden of Sinners: A Study in Murder – Part 2 are the eighth in the timeline of the series.

Plot
In February 1999, set after the sixth installment, Oblivion Recording, a new spate of ferocious murders, that share a disturbing resemblance to the string of homicides in 1995, began.

Set after Oblivion Recording, a new spate of ferocious murders has caught the eye of both Shiki and Daisuke, Mikiya’s cousin who investigated the murders before. Shiki wanders the back alleys of the business district, searching for the murderer and avoiding attacks by local thugs while Mikiya becomes more and more worried about her, beginning his own investigation that takes him down a path populated by drug pushers and prostitutes. The perpetrator, Lio Shirazumi, finds Shiki first but loses an arm in the resulting scuffle; retreating, he discovers Mikiya in his apartment which has become a madman’s shrine to Shiki. Mikiya tries to convince Lio that he can be saved but he refuses and leaves. Shiki is captured and tortured by Lio as she refuses to kill him, Mikiya arrives at the spot but fails to stop Lio and ends up injured. Shiki kills Lio as he told her that he killed Mikiya.

In flashbacks it is shown what happened to Mikiya and Shiki in the last part of the second installment A Study in Murder, Part 1 which led to her being hospitalized as shown in the fourth installment The Hollow Shrine.

Cast

Maaya Sakamoto as 
Kenichi Suzumura as 
Soichiro Hoshi as

Notes 
1.This is a collective pseudonym for several ufotable directors.

References

External links
 
 

2009 anime films
2009 films
Anime composed by Yuki Kajiura
Japanese animated films
2000s Japanese-language films
Kara no Kyōkai
Anime films based on light novels
Ufotable